Sir Terence Norman Beckett  (13 December 1923 – 2 May 2013) was a British businessman, who was chairman of Ford and later became director-general of the Confederation of British Industry.

Early life
Beckett was born on 13 December 1923 in Walsall, Staffordshire, England. He was educated at the private Wolverhampton Grammar School. He then went on to study mechanical engineering at Wolverhampton and Staffordshire Technical college (now Wolverhampton University).

On 14 July 1945, Beckett was commissioned in the British Army as a second lieutenant of the Royal Electrical and Mechanical Engineers. He was given the service number 352178. He saw active service in India and Malaya. He was promoted to lieutenant on 1 January 1949 and granted the honorary rank of captain. He took a BSc in economics at the London School of Economics.

Honours and decorations
Beckett received the General Service Medal (1918) with Malaya clasp for his service during the Malayan Emergency.

He was appointed Commander of the Order of the British Empire (CBE) in 1974. He was knighted in 1978. He was promoted to Knight Commander of the Order of the British Empire (KBE) in 1987.

Beckett received an honorary doctorate from Heriot-Watt University. in 1981

References

External links
Obituary - The Guardian
Obituary - The Telegraph
Obituary - The Times

1923 births
2013 deaths
Businesspeople awarded knighthoods
Ford executives
Knights Bachelor
Knights Commander of the Order of the British Empire
People educated at Wolverhampton Grammar School
Alumni of the University of Wolverhampton
People from Walsall
People in the automobile industry
British Army personnel of the Malayan Emergency
Royal Electrical and Mechanical Engineers officers
Alumni of the London School of Economics
Honorary Fellows of the London School of Economics